The Fengon 580 is a mid-size crossover SUV produced by the Chinese automaker DFSK Motor (joint venture between Dongfeng Motor and Sokon) since 2016. Originally sold as the Dongfeng Fengguang 580, the 580 was also rebadged under a few different brand names that translates to Fengguang in Chinese, including Glory for oversea markets and Fengon in later model years after the Dongfeng Fengguang brand became a further independent brand.

First generation (2016) 

The Fengguang 580 originally debuted at the 2016 Beijing Auto Show in China, and was launched to the Chinese market in June 2016 with prices ranging from 80,900 yuan to 123,000 yuan.

Initially at launch, it was powered by only one engine, a 1.5-litre SFG turbocharged four-cylinder engine, a 1.8-litre SFG naturally-aspirated four-cylinder engine was added later, it is available with two different transmissions, a 6-speed manual and a CVT transmission.

In Indonesia, the Fengguang 580 is sold as the DFSK Glory 580 since 2018. It was first displayed at the 25th Gaikindo Indonesia International Auto Show in August 2017, with a media test drive was held later on 28 November 2017, it was then showcased again at the 26th Indonesia International Motor Show in April 2018, with bookings opened at the same time during the show. The Glory 580 was launched on 19 July 2018 with initial pricing starts from Rp 245 million to Rp 308 million, the launch of the Glory 580 is also commemorated with the Indonesian singer Agnez Mo as the DFSK Indonesia brand ambassador. The Glory 580 is available in two trim levels: Comfort and Luxury. The Comfort trim is available either with a 1.5-litre turbo or a 1.8-litre engine, while the Luxury trim is only available with a 1.5-litre turbo engine. Transmission options includes 5-speed manual (Comfort 1.8 only), 6-speed manual and CVT. The Indonesian-spec DFSK Glory 580 is locally assembled in Indonesia at DFSK's Cikande facility in Serang Regency, Banten and is exported to other countries since 2018 as well, such as Bangladesh, Nepal, Sri Lanka, and Hong Kong. Due to falling demand, the Glory 580 was discontinued in Indonesia in late 2020 while export to other markets continues. For the Indonesian market, it was replaced by an updated flagship variant, the Glory i-Auto.

In South Korea, the Fengguang 580 was launched in 2018 as the DFSK G7, the G7 was sold and distributed by DFSK's South Korean official distributor, Shinwon CK Motors.

In Pakistan, the Fengguang 580 was launched on 24 April 2019 as the DFSK Glory 580, under DFSK's local distributor in Pakistan, Regal Automobiles Industries Limited.

The Fengguang 580 was launched in Russia as the DFM 580, which was announced in late 2018 and eventually went on sale on 8 May 2019. It was also launched as the Glory 580 in Bangladesh on late 2018, in Nepal on 28 March 2019, in Hong Kong on 24 October 2019, and in Morocco on 21 February 2020.

The Fengguang 580 received a facelift in 2018, changes includes redesigned front and rear bumpers, new wheel designs, redesigned rear taillights, and updated interior design and quality.

580 Pro 
The Fengguang 580 Pro is the upmarket variant of the 580, initially only available on the Chinese market. It was first showcased at the 2019 Shanghai Auto Show and went on sale to the public in China on 31 July 2019. The 580 Pro features a different front and rear fascia and is mated with a 6-speed automatic transmission.

The 580 Pro was also sold in Pakistan since 2020 as the DFSK Glory 580 Pro and is locally assembled in Lahore from knock-down kits.

Glory i-Auto 
The DFSK Glory i-Auto is the flagship variant of the 580. It was first unveiled in Indonesia at the 27th Gaikindo Indonesia International Auto Show in July 2019 as a prototype model, based on the Chinese-marketed facelifted 580 that was launched in 2018. In March 2020, DFSK previewed the final production version of the Glory i-Auto which now sports the front fascia from the Chinese-market 580 Pro. It was launched in Indonesia on 22 July 2020 as the replacement of the Glory 580. The Glory i-Auto was also sold in Thailand since 1 September 2021 with units sourced from Indonesia.

Unlike the standard 580, the Glory i-Auto features a voice command system named i-Talk, the system is currently only supports in English language.

Second generation (New Fengon 580; 2021)

The second generation Fengon 580 was launched while the first generation was still offered. Both generations of the 580 were sold alongside each other, with the second generation models being sold as the New 580, and the first generation being sold as a more affordable special edition model called the Red Star Edition. The second generation 580 dashboard is equipped with a dual-screen design, with a 12.3-inch wide interconnected intelligent control screen and a 7-inch full LCD dashboard. The updated model is available as a 2+2+2 setup 6-seater design, with the second row of seats equipped with 8-way electric adjustment, heating, ventilation, and sleeping headrest functions.

In terms of power, the updated 580 is equipped with a 1.5-litre TGDI engine developing a maximum power of 184 horsepower and peak torque of 300 NM, with emissions fulfilling the National 6b Standards. The gearbox is a 6-speed automatic transmission. The powertrain has a fuel consumption of 7 liters per 100 kilometers. The 1.5-litre TGDI engine is independently developed by DFSK and adopts Miller combustion cycle technology.

References

External links

Official website
Official website (DFSK Glory 580, Indonesia)
Official website (DFSK Glory i-Auto, Indonesia)

Mid-size sport utility vehicles
Front-wheel-drive vehicles
2010s cars
Cars introduced in 2016
Cars of China
Vehicles with CVT transmission